Jonathan Wilson (born December 30, 1974) is a producer, songwriter and musician based in LA, California, United States.

Early life
Wilson was born on December 30, 1974, in Forest City, North Carolina and raised in nearby Spindale, North Carolina. Wilson lived his formative years from age 6 to 16 in the small town of Thomasville, NC , Population 15,000 at the time. His father was a local rock and roll bandleader and his grandfather a Baptist pastor whose services Wilson was often invited to play at. Wilson has cited his upbringing in North Carolina and the state's rich jazz and bluegrass musical heritage as an early influence.

Career

Muscadine 
Wilson founded the band Muscadine with Benji Hughes in 1995.  They were scouted and signed by the legendary music business maverick Seymour Stein. The band released their debut album, The Ballad of Hope Nicholls, on Sire Records in 1998.

Solo career 
Wilson released his album Gentle Spirit on Bella Union on August 8, 2011, in the UK and Europe and on September 13, 2011, in the US. The album debuted at number 15 on the UK Indie Chart and was awarded the #4 spot on Mojo's 2011 Best Albums of the Year list. Gentle Spirit features many special guests including Barry Goldberg, Chris Robinson, Gary Louris, Andy Cabic, Otto Hauser, Josh Grange, Gary Mallaber, Z Berg, Adam McDougall, Johnathan Rice, among others. Jonathan was named Uncut Magazine'''s 2011 "New Artist of the Year".

In April 2012, Wilson released "Pity Trials and Tomorrow's Child", a limited edition vinyl EP on Bella Union for Record Store Day 2012. American Songwriter named it, "Five Things To Look For On Record Store Day". One of the album's three tracks, a cover of George Harrison's "Isn't It A Pity", includes guest vocals by Graham Nash.

In October 2013, Wilson released his second album, Fanfare, on Downtown Records and Bella Union. The album debuted at #8 on the UK Indie Chart, #50 on the UK Overall Chart, #18 in the Norway Overall Chart and #49 in the Netherlands in its first week. Uncut Magazine and Rolling Stone Germany named Fanfare its Album of the Month the month of its release. The album features contributions from David Crosby, Graham Nash, Jackson Browne, Mike Campbell, Benmont Tench, Father John Misty, Taylor Goldsmith (Dawes) and Patrick Sansone (Wilco). The album also features Wilson's band, including Jason Borger, Omar Velasco, Richard Gowen and Dan Horne. Roy Harper wrote the lyrics to the song "New Mexico".
 	 	
In February 2018, Wilson released his third solo album Rare Birds. On March 6, 2020, he released his new solo album called Dixie Blur. Wilson also completed a solo album titled Frankie Ray in 2007. The record was never officially released.

 Record producer and other projects 
 Record production 
Wilson currently maintains his recording studio, Fivestar Studios, in  Topanga, California, which he finished building in March 2020. 
The studio was located in Echo Park for 9 years  and relocated from its original location in Laurel Canyon in 2009.

2021 has seen Wilson working on various projects from Angel Olsen, Benmont Tench, Dawes, Bella White, Izzi Manfredi, Margo Price, Sam Burton, and several more.

Wilson has produced the latest Father John Misty album Chloe and the next 20th Century in 2020, he has also produced Erin Rae's Lighten up, and Billy Strings 2X Grammy Nominated "Renewal" in 2020.

In 2019 Wilson and Jackson Browne Co-produced the album "Let the Rhythm Lead" Songs recorded in Haiti for the Artists for Peace and Justice non profit, benefiting the Audio Institute of Haiti, a recording arts training school and recording studio

2019 Wilson produced his own album Dixie Blur alongside coproducer Pat Sansone in Nashville, TN featuring Mark O'Connor, Drew Erickson, Dennis Crouch, Kenny Vaughn, Jon Radford, Russ Pahl, and others.

Over several months in 2013 and 2014, Wilson produced and played on Conor Oberst's new album Upside Down Mountain released on Nonesuch Records in May 2014. The album was recorded at Wilson's Fivestar Studios in Los Angeles and Blackbird Studios in Nashville.

In 2013 Wilson produced "Jubilee", the fifth album from Canadian band, The Deep Dark Woods in Alberta, Canada.

In 2012, Wilson co-produced and played on Roy Harper's latest album, Man and Myth (Bella Union, 2013) at Fivestar Studios. In the same year, Wilson produced a Glen Campbell session at Fivestar Studios for Daytrotter.

In 2011, Wilson co-produced and played on the debut Father John Misty record, Fear Fun released on Sub Pop, at Fivestar Studios.

In 2010, Wilson produced and collaborated with Bonnie 'Prince' Billy on a series of songs for release on Spiritual Pajamas Records, a boutique 7" label associated with Folk Yeah Presents. Wilson recorded and produced Dawes' debut album, North Hills, at his Laurel Canyon studio. That same year, Wilson recorded and produced Dawes' second album, Nothing Is Wrong, at Five Star Studio.

As part of Wilson's project, What You Need Is What You Have, The Songs of Roy Harper, Wilson has produced songs performed by Will Oldham, Andy Cabic, Chris Robinson, Benji Hughes, Dawes, Jenny O., Johnathan Rice, Josh Tillman, and others. Wilson also produced Jason Boesel's album, Hustler's Son, Mia Doi Todd's album Cosmic Ocean Ship and mixed Goodnight Lenin's debut album, In The Fullness Of Time, due for release in late 2014. Wilson has also recorded and/or produced many other artists in his studio, including Gerald Johnson, James Gadson, and Josh Tillman.

 Other music projects 
In 2010 and 2011, Wilson collaborated with Erykah Badu in the studio on several songs, only one of which was officially released. Wilson also appeared as a special guest with Erykah Badu at her 2011 Coachella performance.
 
In April 2011, Wilson performed with Robbie Robertson and Dawes on CBS's Late Show with David Letterman, ABC's The View and Later... with Jools Holland in support of Robertson's album How to Become Clairvoyant.
 
In the fall of 2011, Wilson was invited by Roy Harper as a special guest at Royal Festival Hall as part of Harper's sold out 70th birthday celebration. Wilson also toured with Wilco in the fall of 2011 for 15 shows across the UK & Europe. In July 2011 Wilson performed and collaborated with Jackson Browne and Dawes on a mini tour throughout Spain. Wilson performed at the 2011 benefit concert for Musicians United for Safe Energy. Wilson was joined onstage by Jackson Browne and Graham Nash to perform his song "Gentle Spirit". Wilson also joined Crosby, Stills & Nash, Jackson Browne, Bonnie Raitt and others for the concert's finale, "Teach Your Children".
 
In August 2012, Wilson was featured as a guest of Move Me Brightly, a tribute to Jerry Garcia.  In June 2012, he and his band were invited by Tom Petty & The Heartbreakers to support them on their 2012 European tour, which included 2 sold out nights at Royal Albert Hall.
 
In 2013, Wilson curated a collection of songs as part of What You Need Is What You Have, The Songs of Roy Harper, a Roy Harper tribute album that includes songs performed by Will Oldham, Andy Cabic, Chris Robinson, Benji Hughes, Dawes, Jenny O., Johnathan Rice, Josh Tillman, and others. Wilson was a member of The Emerald Triangle, a touring collaboration with Andy Cabic, Johnathan Rice, Neal Casal, and Husky. In addition, Wilson has recorded projects and/or performed with Johnathan Rice for Reprise Records, Chris Robinson and Phil Lesh Ramblin' Jack Elliott, and Bert Jansch. 
 
In 2017, Wilson appeared on Roger Waters' "Is This the Life We Really Want?" release and played with Waters on the 2017–18 Us + Them tour.

 Laurel Canyon 
Wilson is credited with revitalizing the Laurel Canyon music scene with the help of his many friends and is featured in the 2009 book Canyon of Dreams by rock historian Harvey Kubernik. Wilson had hosted private jam sessions at his compound in Laurel Canyon that involved Andy Cabic, Pat Sansone, John Stirratt, Gerald Johnson, Johnathan Rice, Gary Louris, Mark Olson,
Chris Robinson, David Rawlings, Benmont Tench,  and other notable artists who have played professionally with and/or in The Electric Flag, Paul Butterfield Blues Band, Van Morrison, The Cars, Bruce Springsteen, Steve Miller Band, and Pearl Jam. The jam was founded by Wilson and Chris Robinson.

Personal life
Wilson is married to artist Andrea Nakhla.

 Discography 
 Solo artist 
 Frankie Ray, Pretty and Black Records, 2007
 Gentle Spirit, Bella Union, 2011 (UK Indie chart peak: #15)
 Pity Trials and Tomorrow's Child, Bella Union, 2012
 Fanfare, Downtown Records / Bella Union, October 2013 (UK Indie chart peak: #8, UK Albums Chart peak: #50, Norway chart peak #18)
 Slide By, November 2014
 Rare Birds, Bella Union, March 2, 2018 (UK Albums Chart peak: #79)
 Dixie Blur, BMG, 2020
 The Way I Feel & More, July 2020
 69 Corvette EP, August 2020
 El Camino Real EP, September 2020
 Rare Blur EP, November 2020

 Album production credits 
 Margo Price, Strays, Loma Vista, 2023
 Dawes, Misadventures Of Doomscrolle, 2022
 Angel Olsen, Big Time, Jagjaguwar, 2022
 Father John Misty, Chloe and the Next 20th Century, Sub Pop, 2021
 Billy Strings, Renewal, Rounder Records, 2021
 Erin Rae, Lighten Up, Rounder Records, 2021
 Jonathan Wilson, "Dixie Blur, BMG Records / Bella Union, 2020
 Father John Misty, Pure Comedy, Sub Pop, 2017
 Father John Misty, I Love You, Honeybear, Sub Pop, 2015
 Conor Oberst, Upside Down Mountain, Nonesuch Records, 2014
 Jonathan Wilson, "Fanfare, Downtown Records / Bella Union, 2013
 Roy Harper, "Man and Myth", Bella Union, 2013
 The Deep Dark Woods, "Jubilee", Sugar Hill Records / Six Shooter Records, 2013
 Father John Misty, Fear Fun, Sub Pop, 2012
 Jonathan Wilson, Gentle Spirit, Bella Union, 2011
 Dawes, Nothing Is Wrong, ATO Records, 2011
 Mia Doi Todd, Cosmic Ocean Ship, City Zen Records, 2011
 Jason Boesel, Hustler's Son, Team Love Records, 2010
 Dawes, North Hills, ATO Records, 2009
 Jonathan Wilson, Frankie Ray, Pretty and Black Records, 2007
 Gerald Johnson and James Gadson, Every Day, TBD, TBD
 Jonathan Wilson and Farmer Dave Scher, West Coast Dream Sequence, Vol. 1, TBD, TBD
 Barry Goldberg and Gary Mallaber, Laurel Canyon Sessions – title TBD, TBD, TBD

 As part of Muscadine 
 The Ballad of Hope Nichols, Sire Records, 1998
 LP2, Sire Records
 Live From Studio East, Sire Records

 Song production credits 
 Dawes, "Wild Tales", Be Yourself: A Tribute to Graham Nash's Songs for Beginners, Grass Roots Records, 2010
 Johnathan Rice, "On The Line", Be Yourself: A Tribute to Graham Nash's Songs for Beginners, Grass Roots Records, 2010
 Jonathan Wilson, "La Isla Bonita", Through The Wilderness, A Tribute To Madonna, Manimal Vinyl, 2007
 Bonnie "Prince" Billy, "See You Again", What You Need Is What You Have, The Songs of Roy Harper, TBD, TBD
 Bonnie "Prince" Billy and Mariee Sioux, Grass Roots Record Co., TBD
 Johnathan Rice, "Goldfish", What You Need Is What You Have, The Songs of Roy Harper, TBD, TBD
 Benji Hughes, "Another Day", What You Need Is What You Have, The Songs of Roy Harper, TBD, TBD
 Chris Robinson, "Hallucinating Light", What You Need Is What You Have, The Songs of Roy Harper, TBD, TBD
 Jenny O., "Cherish", What You Need Is What You Have, The Songs of Roy Harper, TBD, TBD
 Whispertown2000, Acony Records
 Ilya Monosov, Holy Mountain Records

 Musician credits 
 Roger Waters, Comfortably Numb 2022, Sony Music, 2022<ref>
 Roger Waters, Is This the Life We Really Want?, Columbia Records, 2017
 Roy Harper, Man and Myth, Bella Union, 2013
 Father John Misty, Fear Fun, Sub Pop, 2012
 Amy Cook, Summer Skin, Thirty Tigers, 2012
 Dawes, Nothing Is Wrong, ATO Records, 2011
 A Fine Frenzy, TBD, Virgin, 2011
 Mia Doi Todd, Cosmic Ocean Ship, City Zen Records, 2011
 Autumn Defense, Once Around, Yep Roc Records, 2010
 Farmer Dave Scher, Flash Forward to the Good Times, Kemado Records, 2010
 Shooter Jennings and Hierophant, Black Ribbons, Black Country Rock, 2010
 Erykah Badu, Maybach Music (as released by Rick Ross), 2010
 Jason Boesel, Hustler's Son, Team Love Records, 2010
 Various Artists, Be Yourself: A Tribute to Graham Nash's Songs for Beginners, Grass Roots Records, 2010
 Dawes, North Hills, ATO Records, 2009
 Vetiver, Tight Knit, Sub Pop, 2009
 Elvis Costello, Momofuku, Lost Highway Records, 2008
 Jenny Lewis, Acid Tongue, Warner Brothers Records, 2008
 Vetiver, Things Of The Past, Gnomonsong, 2008
 Benji Hughes, A Love Extreme, New West Records, 2008
 The Shore, Light Years, Independently Release, 2008
 Gary Louris, Vagabonds, Rykodisc, 2007
 Maria Taylor, Lynn Teeter Flower, Saddle Creek Records, 2007
 Johnathan Rice, Further North, Reprise Records, 2007
 J. Tillman, Fun Times In Babylon, TBD, TBD
 Barry Goldberg, Rhino Records
 Chris Robinson and Phil Lesh, TBD, TBD, TBD
 Big Eagle, Grass Roots Record Co.
 Kevin Barker, You and Me, Gnomonsong
 Jonathan Wilson and Farmer Dave Scher, West Coast Dream Sequence, Vol. 1, TBD, TBD
 Gerald Johnson and James Gadson, Every Day, TBD, TBD
 Bonnie "Prince" Billy and Mariee Sioux, Grass Roots Record Co., TBD
 Various Artists, What You Need Is What You Have, The Songs of Roy Harper'', TBD, TBD

References

External links
 Jonathan Wilson official homepage
 Jonathan Wilson official Youtube channel
 Jonathan Wilson – GENTLE SPIRIT Album Lyrics
 Rare Birds - Track by Track video

1974 births
Living people
American male singer-songwriters
Record producers from California
People from Spindale, North Carolina
Singer-songwriters from North Carolina
People from Laurel Canyon, Los Angeles
21st-century American singers
21st-century American male singers
Bella Union artists
Downtown Records artists